There are a variety of specifications associated with web services. These specifications are in varying degrees of maturity and are maintained or supported by various standards bodies and entities. These specifications are the basic web services framework established by first-generation standards represented by WSDL, SOAP, and UDDI. Specifications may complement, overlap, and compete with each other. Web service specifications are occasionally referred to collectively as "WS-*", though there is not a single managed set of specifications that this consistently refers to, nor a recognized owning body across them all.

Web service standards listings
These sites contain documents and links about the different Web services standards identified on this page.
 IBM Developerworks: Standard and Web Service
 innoQ's WS-Standard Overview
 MSDN .NET Developer Centre: Web Service Specification Index Page
 OASIS Standards and Other Approved Work
 Open Grid Forum Final Document
 XML CoverPage
 W3C's Web Services Activity

XML specification
 XML (eXtensible Markup Language)
 XML Namespaces
 XML Schema
 XPath
 XQuery
 XML Information Set
 XInclude
 XML Pointer

Messaging specification
 SOAP (formerly known as Simple Object Access Protocol)
 SOAP-over-UDP
 SOAP Message Transmission Optimization Mechanism
 WS-Notification
 WS-BaseNotification
 WS-Topics
 WS-BrokeredNotification
 WS-Addressing
 WS-Transfer
 WS-Eventing
 WS-Enumeration
 WS-MakeConnection

Metadata exchange specification
 JSON-WSP
 WS-Policy
 WS-PolicyAssertions
 WS-PolicyAttachment
 WS-Discovery
 WS-Inspection
 WS-MetadataExchange
 Universal Description Discovery and Integration (UDDI)
 WSDL 2.0 Core
 WSDL 2.0 SOAP Binding
 Web Services Semantics (WSDL-S)
 WS-Resource Framework (WSRF)

Security specification
 WS-Security
 XML Signature
 XML Encryption
 XML Key Management (XKMS)
 WS-SecureConversation
 WS-SecurityPolicy
 WS-Trust
 WS-Federation
 WS-Federation Active Requestor Profile
 WS-Federation Passive Requestor Profile
 Web Services Security Kerberos Binding
 Web Single Sign-On Interoperability Profile
 Web Single Sign-On Metadata Exchange Protocol
 Security Assertion Markup Language (SAML)
 XACML

Privacy
 P3P

Reliable messaging specifications
 WS-ReliableMessaging
 WS-Reliability
 WS-RM Policy Assertion

Resource specifications
 Web Services Resource Framework
 WS-Resource
 WS-BaseFaults
 WS-ServiceGroup
 WS-ResourceProperties
 WS-ResourceLifetime
 WS-Transfer
 WS-Fragment
 Resource Representation SOAP Header Block

Web services interoperability (WS-I) specification

These specifications provide additional information to improve interoperability between vendor implementations.
 WS-I Basic Profile
 WS-I Basic Security Profile
 Simple Soap Binding Profile

Business process specifications
 WS-BPEL
 WS-CDL
 Web Service Choreography Interface (WSCI)
 WS-Choreography
 XML Process Definition Language
 Web Services Conversation Language (WSCL)

Transaction specifications
 WS-BusinessActivity
 WS-AtomicTransaction
 WS-Coordination
 WS-CAF
 WS-Transaction
 WS-Context
 WS-CF
 WS-TXM

Management specifications
 WS-Management
 WS-Management Catalog
 WS-ResourceTransfer
 WSDM

Presentation-oriented specification
 Web Services for Remote Portlets

Draft specifications
 WS-Provisioning – Describes the APIs and schemas necessary to facilitate interoperability between provisioning systems in a consistent manner using Web services

Other
 Devices Profile for Web Services (DPWS)
 ebXML

Standardization
 ISO/IEC 19784-2:2007 Information technology -- Biometric application programming interface -- Part 2: Biometric archive function provider interface
 ISO 19133:2005 Geographic information -- Location-based services -- Tracking and navigation
 ISO/IEC 20000-1:2005 Information technology -- Service management -- Part 1: Specification
 ISO/IEC 20000-2:2005 Information technology -- Service management -- Part 2: Code of practice
 ISO/IEC 24824-2:2006 Information technology -- Generic applications of ASN.1: Fast Web Services
 ISO/IEC 25437:2006 Information technology -- Telecommunications and information exchange between systems -- WS-Session -- Web Services for Application Session Services

See also
 Web service

References

Specifications
 
Web service specifications